Giacomo Gentilomo (5 April 1909 – 16 April 2001) was an Italian film director and painter.

Biography

Born in Trieste, at very young age Gentilomo moved to  Rome, where at 21 years old he entered the cinema industry, working as a script survivor and an assistant director. Active  between 1933 and 1937 as a film editor, in 1939 he debuted as a director with Il Carnevale di Venezia. In 1945 his film O sole mio got critical acclaim, but later his career was mainly devoted to genre films, and failed to achieve significant critical interest. Dissatisfied with cinema, in the mid-1960s Gentilomo decided to abandon films and to fulfill his passion for painting.

Filmography

 The Blind Woman of Sorrento (directed by Nunzio Malasomma, 1934)
 I Love You Only (directed by Mario Mattoli, 1935)
Music in the Square (1936)
 White Amazons (1936)
 Sinfonia di Roma (1937, short)
 Condottieri (directed by Luis Trenker, 1937)
 The Carnival of Venice (1939)
 Ecco la radio! (1940)
 La Granduchessa si diverte (1940)
 Brivido (1941)
 Honeymoon (1941)
 Finalmente soli (1942)
 Pazzo d'amore (1942)
 Mater dolorosa (1943)
 Short Circuit (1943)
 In cerca di felicità (1944)
 Tempesta d'anime (1946)
 O sole mio (1946)
 The Lovers (1946)
 Tehran (1946)
 The Brothers Karamazov (1947)
 Snow White and the Seven Thieves (1949)
 Hawk of the Nile (1950)
 Ti ritroverò (1949)
 El Sakr (1950)
 The Young Caruso (1951)
 The Accusation (1951)
 The Blind Woman of Sorrento (1952)
 Immortal Melodies (1953)
 The Two Orphans (1954)
 Appassionatamente (1954)
 Una voce una chitarra e un pò di luna (1956)
 La trovatella di Pompei (1957)
 The Dragon's Blood (1957)
 Knight Without a Country (1958)
 Maciste contro il vampiro (1961)
 The Last of the Vikings (1961)
 Charge of the Black Lancers (1962)
 Brennus, Enemy of Rome (1963)
 Slave Girls of Sheba (1963)
 Hercules Against the Moon Men (1964)

References

External links
 

1909 births
2001 deaths
Italian film directors
Italian film editors